Åsa may refer to:

Given name
 Åsa Domeij (born 1962), former politician for the Swedish Green Party
 Åsa Eriksson (politician) (born 1972), Swedish politician
 Åsa Karlsson (born 1973), Swedish politician
 Åsa Larsson (born 1966), Swedish crime-fiction writer
 Åsa Regnér (born 1964), Swedish politician
 Åsa Romson (born 1972), Swedish politician
 Åsa Sandell (born 1967), Swedish journalist and former boxer
 Åsa Svensson (born 1975), Swedish tennis player
 Åsa Westlund (born 1976), Swedish politician

Other uses
 Åsa, Kungsbacka, Halland County, Sweden
 Åsa IF, a Swedish football club based in Åsa
 Åsa, Ringerike, Buskerud, Norway, a village

See also
 Aasa (disambiguation)
 Asa (disambiguation)
 Åse (disambiguation), the Norwegian version of the name

Feminine given names